The Yupik (plural: Yupiit) are a group of indigenous or aboriginal peoples of western, southwestern, and southcentral Alaska and the Russian Far East. They are related to the Inuit and Iñupiat. Yupik peoples include the following:

 Alutiiq, or Sugpiaq, of the Alaska Peninsula and coastal and island areas of southcentral Alaska.
 Yup'ik or Central Alaskan Yup'ik of the Yukon–Kuskokwim Delta, the Kuskokwim River, and along the northern coast of Bristol Bay as far east as Nushagak Bay and the northern Alaska Peninsula at Naknek River and Egegik Bay in Alaska.
 Siberian Yupik, including Naukan, Chaplino, and — in a linguistic capacity — the Sirenik of the Russian Far East and St. Lawrence Island in western Alaska.

Population
The Yup'ik people are by far the most numerous of the various Alaska Native groups. They speak the Central Alaskan Yup'ik language, a member of the Eskimo–Aleut family of languages.

As of the 2002 United States Census, the Yupik population in the United States numbered more than 24,000, of whom more than 22,000 lived in Alaska, the vast majority in the seventy or so communities in the traditional Yup'ik territory of western and southwestern Alaska. United States census data for Yupik include 2,355 Sugpiat; there are also 1,700 Yupik living in Russia. According to 2019-based United States Census Bureau data, there are 700 Alaskan Natives in Seattle, many of whom are Inuit and Yupik, and almost 7,000 in the state of Washington.

Etymology of name
Yup'ik (plural Yupiit) comes from the Yup'ik word yuk meaning "person" plus the post-base -pik meaning "real" or "genuine". Thus, it literally means "real people." The ethnographic literature sometimes refers to the Yup'ik people or their language as Yuk or Yuit. In the Hooper Bay-Chevak and Nunivak dialects of Yup'ik, both the language and the people are known as Cup'ik.

The use of an apostrophe in the name "Yup’ik", compared to Siberian "Yupik", exemplifies the Central Alaskan Yup’ik's orthography, where "the apostrophe represents gemination [or lengthening] of the ‘p’ sound".

The "person/people" (human being) in the Yupik and Inuit languages:

Origins
The common ancestors of the Eskimo and Aleut (as well as various Paleo-Siberian groups) are believed by anthropologists to have their origin in eastern Siberia, arriving in the Bering Sea area approximately 10,000 years ago. Research on blood types, supported by later linguistic and DNA findings, suggests that the ancestors of other indigenous peoples of the Americas reached North America before the ancestors of the Eskimo and Aleut. There appear to have been several waves of migration from Siberia to the Americas by way of the Bering land bridge, which became exposed between 20,000 and 8,000 years ago during periods of glaciation. By about 3,000 years ago, the progenitors of the Yupiit had settled along the coastal areas of what would become western Alaska, with migrations up the coastal rivers— notably the Yukon and Kuskokwim— around 1400 AD, eventually reaching as far upriver as Paimiut on the Yukon and Crow Village on the Kuskokwim.

The Siberian Yupik may represent a back-migration of the Eskimo people to Siberia from Alaska.

Culture 

Traditionally, families spent the spring and summer at fish camp, then joined others at village sites for the winter. Many families still harvest the traditional subsistence resources, especially Pacific salmon and seal.

The men's communal house, the qasgiq, was the community center for ceremonies and festivals that included singing, dancing, and storytelling. The qasgiq was used mainly during the winter months because people would travel in family groups following food sources throughout the spring, summer, and fall months. Aside from ceremonies and festivals, the qasgiq was also where the men taught the young boys survival and hunting skills, as well as other life lessons. The young boys were also taught how to make tools and qayaq (kayaks) during the winter months in the qasgiq. The ceremonies involve a shaman.

The women's house, the ena, was traditionally right next door. In some areas, the two communal houses were connected by a tunnel. Women taught the young girls how to tan hides and sew, process and cook game and fish, and weave. Boys would live with their mothers until they were approximately five years old, then they would join the men in the qasgiq. 

For a period varying between three and six weeks, the boys and girls would switch cultural educational situations, with the men teaching the girls survival, hunting skills, and toolmaking, and the women teaching the boys the skills they taught to the girls.

In Yup'ik group dances, individuals often remain stationary while moving their upper body and arms rhythmically, their gestures accentuated by handheld dance fans, very similar in design to Cherokee dance fans. The limited motion by no means limits the expressiveness of the dances, which can be gracefully flowing, bursting with energy, or wryly humorous.

The Yup'ik are unique among native peoples of the Americas in that they name children after the most recent person in the community to have died.

The kuspuk (qaspeq) is a traditional Yup'ik garment worn by both genders. In Alaska, it is worn in both casual and formal settings. 

The seal-oil lamp (naniq) was an important piece of furniture.

Languages 

Five Yupik languages (related to Inuktitut) are still very widely spoken; more than 75% of the Yupik/Yup'ik population are fluent in the language. 

Like the Alaskan Iñupiat, the Alaskan and Siberian Yupik adopted the system of writing developed by Moravian Church missionaries during the 1760s in Greenland. The Alaskan Yupik and Iñupiat are the only northern indigenous peoples to have developed their own system of picture writing, but this system died with its creators. Late 19th-century Moravian missionaries to the Yupik in southwestern Alaska used Yupik in church services and translated the scriptures into the people's language.

Russian explorers in the 1800s erroneously identified the Yupik people bordering the territory of the somewhat unrelated Aleut as also Aleut, or Alutiiq, in Yupik. By tradition, this term has remained in use, as well as Sugpiaq, both of which refer to the Yupik of Southcentral Alaska and Kodiak.

The whole Eskimo–Aleut languages family  is shown below:

 Eskimo–Aleut languages
Aleut language
Eskimo languages
Inuit languages
Yupik languages
 Alaskan:
Central Alaskan Yup'ik language (Central Yupik language), ISO 639:esu
Alutiiq language (Pacific Gulf Yupik language), ISO 639:ems
 Siberian:
Central Siberian Yupik language (Yuit), ISO 639:ess
Naukan Yupik language, ISO 639:ynk
Sirenik language, ISO 639:ysr

See also
List of Alaska Native tribal entities
List of Notable Central Alaskan Yup'ik people

Notes

Further reading
 Barker, James H. (1993). Always Getting Ready  — Upterrlainarluta: Yup'ik Eskimo Subsistence in Southwest Alaska. Seattle, Washington: University of Washington Press.
 Branson, John and Tim Troll, eds. (2006). Our Story: Readings from Southwest Alaska — An Anthology. Anchorage, Alaska: Alaska Natural History Association.
 Federal Field Committee for Development Planning in Alaska. (1968). Alaska Natives & The Land. Washington, D.C.: U.S. Government Printing Office.
 Campbell, Lyle. (1997). American Indian languages: The historical linguistics of Native America. New York: Oxford University Press. .
  Fienup-Riordan, Ann. (1983). The Nelson Island Eskimo: Social Structure and Ritual Distribution. Anchorage, Alaska: Alaska Pacific University Press.
 Fienup-Riordan, Ann. (1990). Eskimo Essays: Yup'ik Lives and How We See Them. New Brunswick, New Jersey: Rutgers University Press.
 Fienup-Riordan, Ann. (1991). The Real People and the Children of Thunder: The Yup'ik Eskimo Encounter With Moravian Missionaries John and Edith Kilbuck. Norman, Oklahoma: University of Oklahoma Press.
 Fienup-Riordan,ka Geographic 6(3). Alaska Geographic Society.
 Naske, Claus-M. and Herman E. Slotnick. (1987). Alaska: A History of the 49th State, 2nd edition. Norman, Oklahoma: University of Oklahoma Press.
 Oswalt, Wendell H. (1967). Alaskan Eskimos. Scranton, Pennsylvania: Chandler Publishing Company.
 Oswalt, Wendell H. (1990). Bashful No Longer: An Alaskan Eskimo Ethnohistory, 1778–1988. Norman, Oklahoma: University of Oklahoma Press.
 Pete, Mary. (1993). "Coming to Terms." In Barker, 1993, pp. 8–10.
Reed, Irene, et al. Yup’ik Eskimo Grammar. Alaska: University of Alaska, 1977.
 de Reuse, Willem J. (1994). Siberian Yupik Eskimo: The language and its contacts with Chukchi''. Studies in indigenous languages of the Americas. Salt Lake City: University of Utah Press. .

External links
 Alaska Native Language Center
 Genealogical tree 
 The distribution map of Yupik languages.
 Project Naming, the identification of Inuit portrayed in photographic collections at Library and Archives Canada

 
Indigenous peoples in the Arctic
Alaska Native ethnic groups
Ethnic groups in Siberia
Hunter-gatherers of the Arctic
Indigenous peoples of North Asia
Indigenous small-numbered peoples of the North, Siberia and the Far East
Native American tribes in Alaska
Yupic